Pyriatyn is a city in Poltava Oblast, Ukraine. It is the administrative center of Pyriatyn Raion. Population:

History 
At the end of 1941 or beginning 1942, a ghetto guarded by policemen was established and numbered over 1,500 Jews by late March 1942.
There were two major executions of Jews carried out by SD units Sonderkommando Plath, accompanied by Ukrainian auxiliary police. The first one took place on April 6, 1942, about 1530 Jews were taken to the woods, 3 km away from the town, and murdered. The second mass execution took place on May 18, 1942, when several Jewish families were killed along with 380 communists and Soviet militants, and 25 Gypsy families.

Gallery

See also
Piryatin Airport

References

External links
 The murder of the Jews of Pyriatyn during World War II, at Yad Vashem website.

Cities in Poltava Oblast
Piryatinsky Uyezd
Cities of district significance in Ukraine
Holocaust locations in Ukraine